Dancing Rabbit is an ecovillage near Rutledge, Missouri, USA.

Dancing Rabbit is an intentional community in the pioneering stage. Its current, on site population is around 30 people with the intention of growing to a small, locally self-reliant town of 500 to 1000 residents. All members of Dancing Rabbit agree to abide by ecological covenants and sustainability guidelines. Residents are responsible for their own finances, food, housing, and other necessities. There are a number of co-ops residents can elect to be a part of. These co-ops include services for vehicles, food, health care, showers, phone, and internet. The town includes egalitarian communities, cohousing, and individual households.

Dancing Rabbit aims to create a culture that is environmentally and also socially sustainable. The community's culture incorporates feminism, respect for the arts, consensus decision-making, nonviolence, and nonviolent communication. The common desire for environmental sustainability underlies all decisions at Dancing Rabbit. The community promotes itself as a viable example of sustainable living and aims to spread its vision through visitor programs, internships, work exchange, academic and other publications, and speaking engagements.

Two other intentional communities neighbor Dancing Rabbit: Sandhill Farm, and Red Earth Farms. The three communities are known locally as the 'tri-communities'.

In the Media

In 2005, Dancing Rabbit was featured in an episode of the FX television series 30 Days, in which members taught their way of life to two mainstream non-residents for one month.  The two lived in a converted grain bin and helped with various projects such as gardening, natural building and cooking.

The Rhythm of Rutledge

Dancing Rabbit, along with Sandhill Farm and Red Earth Farms, is featured in the 2012 documentary short The Rhythm of Rutledge.

My World, Too

My World, Too, a television series focused on sustainable living practices produced an episode titlied Dancing Rabbit Eco Village. PBS aired the episode on 13 June 2022 with reruns on PBS stations into 2023 and on the PBS website. The show addressed sustainable practices and details of living in the ecovillage such as finances.

Mission statement
To create a society, the size of a small town or village, made up of individuals and communities of various sizes and social structures, which allows and encourages its members to live sustainably.

To encourage this sustainable society to grow to have the size and recognition necessary to have an influence on the global community by example, education, and research.

References

External links
 Dancing Rabbit Ecovillage summary, at The Fellowship for Intentional Community
 Dancing Rabbit Ecovillage website
 Red Earth Farms website
 Sandhill Farm website

Ecovillages
Populated places established in 1997